Arthur Storer (1645–1687) was America's first colonial astronomer. He came to Calvert County, Maryland, from Lincolnshire, England.  He was among the first observers to sight and record data about a magnificent comet that passed over Patuxent skies in 1682. Storer's work shows up in a number of Newton's writings. The comet became known as Storer's Comet, until Edmund Halley later predicted the comet's return; thereafter this celestial marvel was known as Halley's Comet.
His observations of the great comet of 1680 are mentioned twice in Newton's Philosophiae Naturalis Principia Mathematica.
A planetarium bearing Storer's name is located in Prince Frederick, Maryland.

Isaac Newton

Isaac Newton's well known confessions list in the Fitzwilliam notebook of 1662 includes "beating Arthur Storer".

When Isaac was about 12 years old, he was sent away to the Grammar school in Grantham.  While in school he boarded at the home of William Clarke, an apothecary on Grantham High Street next to the George Inn.  Clarke was the second husband of Arthur's mother Katherine. Katherine brought her four children Edward, Arthur, Katherine and Ann to the marriage.

Arthur's sister Katherine Storer, did not deny that Newton may have had a romantic interest in her.  William Stukeley interviewed her in 1727 after Newton's death when she was 'Mrs Vincent' a widow of 82 years. He wrote: "Sir Isaac & she being thus brought up together, it is said that he entertain'd a passion for her, when they grew up: nor dos she deny it.

Storer's Comet
At about dawn on August 14, 1682, looking westward over the Patuxent River near Hunting Creek, Arthur Storer apparently saw what is now known as Storer's Comet.  The comet stayed visible in the area until September 18, 1682.

Storer's observations of the comet are considered to be the most accurate of his contemporaries with the exception of the Royal Observatory in Greenwich.

Ancestry

References

External links
"Arrthur Storer: Maryland's Astronomer Extraordinaire"
"Arthur Storer Planetarium"
"Calvert County, 350 Years – Early Resident Arthur Storer"
"Early Years of Isaac Newton"
"The Heritage of Calvert County, Maryland For the Young Reader"
"Photos of the Planetarium and of the Historic Marker"
"Will of Arthur Storer – 1686"

1645 births
1687 deaths
17th-century American astronomers
Isaac Newton
People from Calvert County, Maryland
People from Grantham
People from Lincolnshire
People of colonial Maryland